The Río Negro (Spanish for "black river") is one of the principal tributaries of the Rahue River in southern Chile. It runs from south to north draining part of the eastern slopes of Cordillera Pelada. The commune of Río Negro derives its name from the river.

See also
List of rivers of Chile

Rivers of Chile
Negro